Kraan is a German band based in Ulm and formed in 1970.

People with surname
 Axel van der Kraan 
 Eric Kraan
 Gerda Kraan
 Greetje Kraan
 Helena van der Kraan

See also 
 Krahn (disambiguation)
 Kran (disambiguation)